Elland Power Station was a coal-fired power station situated adjacent to the Manchester to Wakefield railway line and on a loop of the River Calder, north east of the town of Elland in West Yorkshire. The station occupied a site of some 65 acres.

History
The construction of Elland Power Station was planned in 1945. It was designed and built by the then Central Electricity Generating Board (CEGB), Northern Project Group. Building work began in 1951 and the project cost £10 million. The first generating unit began generating electricity on 7 August 1959, but the station did not officially open and begin generating at full capacity until 28 April 1961. The station used three Metropolitan Vickers 180 MW generating sets. Later in the 1960s, the station won an award for its clean and efficient operation. There were three boilers (two John Brown, one Yarrow) each rated for 69 kg/s of steam; steam conditions were 62.06 bar and 482 °C. The cooling towers were built by Davenport Engineering.

The generating capacity, electricity output and thermal efficiency were as shown in the table.

Coal from the Yorkshire coalfields was delivered by train on the adjacent Calder Valley Line and moved around the site using 0-4-0 shunters. Elland No. 1, a CEGB 0-4-0 diesel shunter is preserved at Mangapps Railway Museum, Burnham-on-Crouch, Essex.

On 22 November 1971, the station's conveyor belt was destroyed in a fire. After the UK's electric supply industry was privatised in 1989, the station was operated by PowerGen. The station closed in 1991 before being demolished in 1996. The station's site is now the site of Lowfields Industrial Estate although the associated switching substation was retained and remains in use.

References

External links

Image on Historic England

Buildings and structures in Calderdale
Coal-fired power stations in England
Power stations in Yorkshire and the Humber
Elland
1959 establishments in England
1991 disestablishments in England
Energy infrastructure completed in 1959
Buildings and structures demolished in 1996
Demolished power stations in the United Kingdom
Former coal-fired power stations in the United Kingdom
Former power stations in England